The Saxon II K (two K) were a class of two  Fairlie locomotives built for the Royal Saxon State Railways with a gauge of . They were retired from service by 1909; in 1913 the classification was reused for pairs of I K locomotives coupled back-to-back. Consequently, there is a distinction between the class II K (old) and II K (new).

History 
Since 1881, numerous narrow-gauge lines, some of them with many bends and inclines, had been opened in Saxony, and the volume of traffic had steadily increased. The performance of the I K initially used was soon no longer sufficient.  Therefore, in 1885Hawthorn, Leslie and Company of Newcastle upon Tyne in England delivered two Fairlie locomotives for 51.771 Marks each. Both locomotives were placed in class Hth F TK, signifying that there were Fairlie type (F) tank locomotives (T) with  gauge (K) from the manufacturer Hawthorn (Hth). They were given the fleet numbers 18 and 19. From 1896 the classification was changed to K II, and from 1900 to II K.

The locomotives were not successful. Above all, the conditions for the locomotive crew were completely unreasonable. A downright acrobatic skill was required of the fireman in order to service both fireboxes in his narrow side of the cab with the necessary coal. In addition, the locomotives were too heavy for most routes.

No further procurement was made in favour of class III K. The two locomotives were retired in 1903 (No. 18) and 1909 (No. 19).

Technical features 
The locomotives had a double boiler with two fireboxes. They had four saturated steam cylinders with a Walschaerts valve gear (Heusinger) control for each engine. Their top speed was

References 

 
  (Eisenbahn-Journal – Archiv 1998, 1).
 

Hawthorn Leslie and Company locomotives
Fairlie locomotives
750 mm gauge locomotives
02 K
0-4-4-0T locomotives
Narrow gauge steam locomotives of Germany
Railway locomotives introduced in 1885